Damian Martin is an Australian make-up artist specializing in prosthetic and creature makeup. He worked with Jim Henson's Creature Shop on the TV series Farscape and has worked on such films as Star Wars: Episode II – Attack of the Clones and Star Wars: Episode III – Revenge of the Sith. In 2016, he won an Academy Award for Best Makeup and Hairstyling along with Elka Wardega and :Lesley Vanderwalt at the 88th Academy Awards for his work on the movie Mad Max: Fury Road. He was also nominated for a BAFTA Award for Best Makeup and Hair in the 69th British Academy Film Awards.

References

Australian make-up artists
Living people
Best Makeup Academy Award winners
Best Makeup BAFTA Award winners
Year of birth missing (living people)